Domingo Santos (December 15, 1941 – November 2, 2018) was the pseudonym of Spaniard science fiction author Pedro Domingo Mutiñó. He is among the best-known science fiction authors in Spain. Together with Sebastián Martínez and Luis Vigil he founded the Spanish science fiction magazine Nueva Dimensión. A science fiction prize, awarded annually at the national science fiction convention HispaCon, is named in his honor.

He has also used the pseudonyms Peter Danger and Peter Dean.

Works (incomplete)
 Gabriel, historia de un robot (Novela, 1963)
 Burbuja (Novela, 1965)
 Meteoritos (short stories, 1965)
 Futuro imperfecto (short stories, 1981)
 No lejos de la Tierra (short stories, 1986)

References

1941 births
2018 deaths
Spanish science fiction writers